Henrietta Independent School District is a public school district based in Henrietta, Texas (USA).

In addition to Henrietta, the district serves the city of Jolly as well as rural areas in central Clay County.

In 2009, the school district was rated "academically acceptable" by the Texas Education Agency.

Schools
Henrietta High School (Grades 9-12)
Henrietta Middle School (Grades 6-8)
Henrietta Elementary School (Grades PK-5)

References

External links
Henrietta ISD

School districts in Clay County, Texas